Shatu may refer to:shatu

China
(Shātǔ (沙土))
 Shatu, Anhui, town in Qiaocheng District, Bozhou
 Shatu, Guizhou, town in Jinsha County
 Shatu, Shandong, town in Mudan District, Heze

Iran
(Shatū (شتو))
 Shatu, Iran, a village in Fars Province